"Dumb Dumb" (stylized in all caps) is a song recorded by Canadian-Dutch-Korean singer and songwriter Jeon Somi. It was released by The Black Label and Interscope Records on August 2, 2021, as a pre-release single from the singer's debut studio album XOXO. The song peaked at number 8 on the Gaon Digital Chart and at number 9 on the K-pop Hot 100, becoming Somi's first top-ten single on both charts.

Background and release 

On July 14, 2021, The Black Label confirmed that Jeon Somi would make a comeback, though it was unclear whether in what format the comeback would be. Then, they released first promotional poster on July 23, that revealed the format as a single, it also included the song's release date and the title of the single "Dumb Dumb". The following day the second promotional poster was released. On July 26, the third promotional poster was released. On July 28, the fourth promotional poster was released. On the next day, they released the fifth promotional poster. On August 1, a credits poster was unveiled revealing the Somi was involved in the songs's writing. On August 2, "Dumb Dumb" was released digitally at 18:00 (KST).

The original lyrics to the hook of the song were "Imma say it like it is/ cut the bullsh*t/ you dumb dumb"; in the official version, they have been translated to Korean. Jeon attributed the longer wait between comebacks to this recording process and vouched it makes the result good.

Critical reception

NMEs Rhian Daly gave the song a two-star rating calling it "frustrating and underwhelming." She commented how "Dumb Dumb" could be stronger if it was given time to develop "but at two minutes and 30 seconds, it's over before it really gets going." Although reviewing the song negatively she called the "chorus' dirty bass" and "Somi's accompanying shift into her lower register alluring and arresting." Yeom Dong-gyo of IZM gave "Dumb Dumb" a two and half star rating and said the song "blends the boldness of "What You Waiting For" and the freshness of "Birthday".

Music video 
On July 30, the music video teaser was released. On August 2, the official music video was released. It features Somi, who appeared as a high school student that falls in love with one of the most handsome members of the sports team at lunchtime, and then goes into operation to get a confession. Turned out, both of them were pretending to play "dumb" so they can approached with each other. At the end of the video, Somi looks happy after receiving the man's confession. With some eye-catching animations inserted in the middle, the music video felt like a teen movie. It gained ten million views in just a day.

Promotion 
On the same day as the song release, an online media showcase was held for Somi to celebrate the release with JooE from Momoland as the MC. Somi also held a comeback live stream on her official TikTok account.

Accolades

Charts

Weekly charts

Monthly charts

Year-end charts

Release history

Notes

References

2021 songs
2021 singles
Interscope Records singles
Songs written by Teddy Park